Aspergillus neocarnoyi is a species of fungus in the genus Aspergillus. It is from the Aspergillus section. The species was first described in 1989. It has been reported to produce asperentins, asperflavin, auroglaucin, a bisanthron, dihydroauroglaucin, echinulins, flavoglaucin, neoechinulins, questin, questinol, tetracyclic, and tetrahydroauroglaucin.

Growth and morphology

A. neocarnoyi has been cultivated on both Czapek yeast extract agar (CYA) plates and Malt Extract Agar Oxoid® (MEAOX) plates. The growth morphology of the colonies can be seen in the pictures below.

References 

neocarnoyi
Fungi described in 1989